Green S is a green synthetic coal tar triarylmethane dye with the molecular formula C27H25N2O7S2Na.

As a food dye, it has E number E142. It can be used in mint sauce, desserts, gravy granules, sweets, ice creams, and tinned peas.  Green S is prohibited as a food additive in Canada, United States, Japan, and Norway. It is approved for use as a food additive in the EU and Australia and New Zealand.

Green S is a vital dye, meaning it can be used to stain living cells. It is used in ophthalmology, along with fluorescein and rose bengal, to diagnose various disorders of the eye's surface, dry eyes for example.

References

External links
 Eighteenth Report of the Joint FAO/WHO Expert Committee on Food Additives (JECFA), Wld Hlth Org. techn. Rep. Ser., 1974, No. 557. FAO Nutrition Meetings Report Series, 1974, No. 54.
http://www.efsa.europa.eu/en/efsajournal/pub/1851
http://apps.who.int/food-additives-contaminants-jecfa-database/chemical.aspx?chemID=2119
http://www.fao.org/food/food-safety-quality/scientific-advice/jecfa/jecfa-additives/detail/en/c/107/

Triarylmethane dyes
Food colorings
Vital stains
2-Naphthols
Naphthalenesulfonates
Anilines
Organic sodium salts
E-number additives
Acid dyes